Sherri Smith Buffington is an American politician. She served as a Republican member for the 38th district of the Louisiana State Senate.

Buffington attended at Centenary College of Louisiana and Louisiana State University. In 2004, she won the election for the 38th district of the Louisiana State Senate. Buffington succeeded Ron Bean. In 2016, she was succeeded by John Milkovich for the 38th district.

References 

Living people
Place of birth missing (living people)
Year of birth missing (living people)
Republican Party Louisiana state senators
21st-century American politicians
21st-century American women politicians
Centenary College of Louisiana alumni
Louisiana State University alumni